The March of the Living is an annual educational program which brings students from around the world to Poland, where they explore the remnants of the Holocaust. On Holocaust Memorial Day observed in the Jewish calendar, thousands of participants march silently from Auschwitz to Birkenau, the largest Nazi concentration camp complex built during World War II.

History
The program was established in 1988 and takes place annually for two weeks around April and May, immediately following Passover.  Marchers have come from over 50 countries, as diverse as United States, Canada, Australia, New Zealand, China, Estonia, Panama, Mexico, Argentina, Brazil, Hungary, and Turkey.

The Israeli founders of the March of the Living were politician Avraham Hirschson educator Dr. Shmuel Rosenman, and attorney Baruch Adler. They were assisted in the early years by Jewish communal leaders and philanthropists from the United States (Alvin Schiff, Gene Greenzweig, Dr. David Machlis, and Joseph Wilf, the first North American Chair of the March of the Living), and Canada (Walter Hess, Shlomo Shimon, Rabbi Irwin Witty,  and Eli Rubenstein).

Commemoration of World War II death marches 
The climax of the program is the March, which is designed to contrast with the death marches which occurred towards the end of World War II.  When Nazi Germany withdrew its soldiers from forced-labour camps, inmates – most already starving and stricken by oppressive work – were forced to march hundreds of miles further west, while those who lagged behind or fell were shot or left to freeze to death in the winter climate. The March of the Living, in contrast to the death marches, serves to illustrate the continued existence of the Jewish people despite Nazi attempts at their obliteration.

After spending a week in Poland visiting other sites of Nazi Germany's persecution, such as Majdanek, Treblinka, and the Warsaw Ghetto, and former sites of Jewish life and culture, various Synagogues, many of the participants in the March also travel on to Israel where they observe Yom Hazikaron (Israel's Remembrance Day) and celebrate Yom Haatzmaut (Israel's Independence Day).

Educational value 
The March of the Living is mainly aimed at Jewish high school students and its goals are both universal (fighting indifference, racism and injustice) and particular (opposing anti-semitism, and strengthening their sense of Jewish identity).

A key element of the program is the participation of Holocaust survivors who share the memories of their war-time experiences with the students, while they are still well enough to participate in this challenging two-week trip of the young.

Though the vast majority of participants in the March of the Living are Jewish high school students from different countries including Israel, there are many non-Jewish groups in attendance, along with adult groups such as the Polish Friends of Israel, Japan's Bridges for Peace and others. One of the largest groups are students from Polish schools, with over 1,000 attending annually in recent years.

Exhibit 
In mid January 2014 a new exhibit on the March of the Living opened at the United Nations, which housed the exhibit until the end of March 2014. Titled "When you Listen to a Witness, You Become a Witness", the exhibit includes photographs, documents and writings devoted to the 25-year history of the March of the Living. The exhibit tells the stories of the aging survivors and their young students who, hand in hand, embark on a life-changing journey and return profoundly transformed.  It also contains archival photos of deportation and mass murder from the Holocaust period.

An interactive component of the exhibition allows visitors to fill out their own pledge of tolerance and compassion which may be taken on the March of the Living and planted alongside thousands of other plaques of tolerance and compassion on the very grounds of Auschwitz-Birkenau.

The title of the exhibit is taken from the words of Judy Weissenberg Cohen in a speech given to students on the 1997 March of the Living describing the last time she saw her mother during the selection of Hungarian Jewry in Auschwitz-Birkenau in the spring of 1944.

On March 10, 2014, a group of students from New York's Pine Bush High School – part of a district where there have been press reports alleging widespread anti-Semitism – visited the UN Exhibit. They were addressed by Holocaust survivors Judy Weissenberg Cohen and Fanya Heller, as well as by Rick Carrier, a World War II Liberator.

In November 2015, the Exhibit was mounted at the Auschwitz-Birkenau State Museum.

The UN Exhibit became the basis of a book published in the fall of 2015, titled, Witness: Passing the Torch of Holocaust Memory to New Generations. The book has a unique interactive feature where the survivors, World War II liberators, and Righteous Among the Nations featured in the book, include an invisible link embedded on their image. When their image is accessed with a smart phone or other device, the reader is taken to an excerpt of their video testimony on USC Shoah Foundation Institute for Visual History and Education (created by Steven Spielberg) or March of the Living Digital Archive Project websites. Translations in several other languages are already in the works.

In recent years the March of the Living (MOTL) has attempted to broaden its focus from only concentrating on the Holocaust, and include other program content in the Poland portion of the trip. These elements include: celebrating Jewish life before the war, establishing dialogue with Polish students, meeting with Polish Righteous among the Nations, and connecting with the contemporary Polish Jewish community.

In April 2017, in a speech to the March of the Living program at Auschwitz for Holocaust Remembrance Day, Elisha Wiesel said that the United States and European countries had not learned the lessons of the Holocaust, because many in those countries had turned away Syrian refugees fleeing chemical warfare. Wiesel added: "Will you stand by when African-Americans have reason to be terrified of a routine traffic stop, when Christians are slaughtered in Egypt because they are labelled infidels, when girls in Chad, Somalia, Afghanistan, and Pakistan are threatened, raped, or shot for pursuing an education, when homosexuality in Iran is a crime that carries the death penalty?"

Supplementary programs 

The March of Remembrance and Hope (MRH) is a program designed for university/college students of all religions and backgrounds. This program, founded in 2001, takes place in May, and in recent years, has included a 2-day trip to Germany, before the 5 day Poland portion of the trip. The purpose of the March of Remembrance and Hope is to teach students of various religious and ethnic backgrounds about the dangers of intolerance through the study of the Holocaust and other World War II genocides, and to promote better relations among people of diverse cultures. Holocaust survivors also participate in the March of Remembrance and Hope program. Since its inception, students of a wide variety of religions and ethnicities have taken part.

Cultural impact 

In 2009 two different documentaries featured March of the Living participants or students on similar experiences during their time on the trip. The documentary Defamation, by filmmaker Yoav Shamir, includes a group of Israeli students during their time at Poland sites, including the stop at Auschwitz.  Director Jessica Sanders made a documentary titled March of the Living, which focuses entirely on the program and participants.

Late 2015 saw the release of Blind Love, a documentary film about blind Israelis traveling to Poland with the help of their guide dogs on the March of the Living to learn about the Holocaust. The film, Blind Love: A Holocaust Journey Through Poland with Man's Best Friend, premiered during Holocaust Education Week in Toronto, with the co-sponsorship of the Toronto Jewish Film Festival. It was also broadcast on the CBC's Canadian speciality channel Documentary in late 2015 and then again in 2017 on Holocaust Remembrance Day, as well as in Israel on its main station Channel 10 (Israel) on the same day.

2020 cancellation  
For the first time since its inception in 1988, the March of the Living program to Poland and Israel was cancelled due to the COVID-19 pandemic, affecting thousands of prospective participants – including students, survivors, educators and dignitaries from around the world.

In response, the March of the Living created 3 initiatives.

The March of the Living Virtual Plaque Project continued the March of the Living tradition of placing messages of peace, hope and remembrance, on wooden plaques on the train tracks of Auschwitz-Birkenau on Holocaust Remembrance Day.

March of the Living offered a digital option of submitting virtual plaques with personal messages, which would be featured on the March of the Living website in the days leading to Holocaust Remembrance Day and beyond. The first plaque was submitted by Israeli President, Reuven Rivlin, followed by other well-known figures including Rabbi Jonathan Sacks and Mayim Bialik. On the eve of Holocaust Remembrance Day, a number of plaques were projected onto the guard tower and gates of Auschwitz-Birkenau. The current number of completed plaques is approaching 18,000.

In place of the actual March of the Living walk and ceremony in Auschwitz-Birkenau on Holocaust Remembrance Day, a March of the Living Virtual Ceremony was held on Holocaust Remembrance Day.

The program featured Israeli President Rivlin, USC Shoah Foundation Founder Steven Spielberg, survivor testimony, speeches from student Alumni and Holocaust educators, and performances from past March of the Living singers and musicians. A student led virtual candle lighting ceremony mirroring the torch lighting ceremony that would conclude the ceremony on Auschwitz-Birkenau was also held. The virtual ceremony  was sponsored by The Miller Center for Community Protection and Resilience at Rutgers University, with the participation of the USC Shoah Foundation, whose 360 Degree survivor testimony interviews – utilizing the testimony of March of the Living survivor testimony in situ - was highlighted during the ceremony.

The ceremony was broadcast live on Facebook, on  Jewish Broadcasting Service Television as well as on Reuters Europe.ceremony 

“This year, for the first time in 32 years, we are not able to march in Auschwitz-Birkenau, but that will not stop us. We will continue to educate the next generation with the values we have been teaching for three decades.”Dr. Shmuel Rosenman,  March of the Living Chairman, “

“We were bitterly disappointed to have to postpone this year’s March of the Living. However, we remain utterly determined to ensure that the unparalleled tragedy of the Holocaust remains at the forefront of the world’s conscience. Given the distressing recent rise in global antisemitism and today’s need for greater compassion and tolerance, the lessons of the Holocaust are more relevant than ever,”  March of the Living president, Phyllis Greenberg Heideman.

Reuven Rivlin, President of Israel, who was the honoured with filling out the initial plaque, stated: “75 years after the Holocaust the terrible tragedy of our people as antisemitism raises its ugly head once again across the world the nations of the world must stand together. Together in the struggle against racism. Together in the struggle against antisemitism and extremism. Together for the protection of democratic values and human dignity. This is the mission of our time. This is our challenge..”

See also
Edward Mosberg, Holocaust survivor, one of the biggest supporters of the International March of the Living, often attending the march wearing his original concentration camp uniform.

References

Further reading

External links 

 March of the Living International
 http://www.marchoftheliving.org Canadian organization
 http://www.marchadelavida.com.mx Marcha de la Vida México
 http://www.remembranceandhope.com
 http://www.viaje.co.il/marcha
 Marcha da Vida - Brasil
 BBC article about the March of Living, 2005
 Comment by Tad Taube in The Forward, May 5, 2006
 http://www.cjnews.com/index.php?option=com_content&task=view&id=11803&Itemid=86
 https://web.archive.org/web/20080819192906/http://www.cse.edu/blog/index.php/2007/02/09/college-of-saint-elizabeth-student-promotes-prejudice-reduction-at-the-united-nations-annual-holocaust-day#more-99
 View March of the Living Exhibit at Auschwitz-Birkenau State Museum.

Holocaust commemoration
Auschwitz concentration camp
Marching
Genocide education
1988 establishments in Poland